The Catholic Union was a Costa Rican political party, emerged during the government of President José Rodríguez Zeledón. It was the first ideological party founded in Costa Rica. Its full name was Catholic Union of the Clergy of Costa Rica, and it had a conservative and confessional ideology, although it also endorsed the nascent Social doctrines of the Catholic Church. It participated in the legislative elections of 1892 and obtained an important number of deputies, although not enough to impose itself over the coalition liberals and pro-government of Rodriguez.

For the elections of 1894 it nominates the former Regent of the Supreme Court of Justice José Gregorio Trejos Gutiérrez, and although in the first degree elections, held in February of that year, it won, the government suspended individual guarantees, imprisoned the candidate and numerous voters and forced things so that in the elections of the second degree get elected Rafael Yglesias Castro, Secretary of War and Navy and son-in-law of President Rodríguez. The Catholic Union practically disappeared, and in 1895 a constitutional reform arranged that political propaganda could not be made invoking reasons of religion nor using religious beliefs. One of its main leaders was the coffee grower Alejo E. Jiménez Bonnefil (1858-1922) who came to occupy the presidency of the party and was joined by ties of friendship with the notable bishop Bernardo Augusto Thiel (1850-1901), promoter and godfather of the Catholic Union.

The Catholic Union had a clericalist ideology, it was also notably anti-Freemasonic, in fact one of the requisites to be a member of the party was not to be a Freemason and they spread anti-Freemasonic literature including the Handbook of the Anti-Freemason League.

For the elections of 1906 arises a conservative party clearly linked to the former Catholic Union and that shared much of its leadership, the Democratic Union, which nominated Ezequiel Gutiérrez Iglesias for president.

References

Defunct political parties in Costa Rica
Defunct conservative parties
Christianity in Costa Rica
Anti-Masonry